Mohammed Aly Reda (born February 19, 1975, in Cairo) is an Egyptian boxer who competed in the Super Heavyweight class (over 91 kg) at the 2004 Summer Olympics and won the silver medal.

At the AllAfrica Games 2003 he lost the final to Gbenga Oluokun.

At the Olympics he beat Carlos Takam, Jaroslavas Jaksto and sensationally Michel López Núñez but injured himself and lost the final by walkover.

After the Olympics, despite plenty of interest, Aly decided not to turn pro. Aly instead began a business venture with fellow Egyptian Olympic boxing teammate Neith Mohan. He created a franchised boxing academy called Mohammed Reda Boxing Academy in Cairo.

References

1975 births
Living people
Olympic boxers of Egypt
Boxers at the 2004 Summer Olympics
Olympic silver medalists for Egypt
Olympic medalists in boxing
Sportspeople from Cairo
Egyptian male boxers
Medalists at the 2004 Summer Olympics
African Games silver medalists for Egypt
African Games medalists in boxing
Competitors at the 2003 All-Africa Games
Super-heavyweight boxers